My Blue Heaven is a 1990 American crime comedy film directed by Herbert Ross, written by Nora Ephron, and starring Steve Martin, Rick Moranis, and Joan Cusack. This is the third film in which Martin and Moranis starred together. It has been noted for its relationship to Goodfellas, which was released one month later. Both films are based on the life of Henry Hill, although the character is renamed "Vincent 'Vinnie' Antonelli" in My Blue Heaven. Goodfellas was based on the book Wiseguy by Nicholas Pileggi, while the screenplay for My Blue Heaven was written by Pileggi's wife Nora Ephron, and much of the research for both works was done in the same sessions with Hill.

Plot
Vinnie Antonelli is a former mobster recently inducted into the Witness Protection Program with his wife, Linda. The two are under the watchful eye of federal agent Barney Coopersmith. Vinnie and Barney soon find common ground when both of their wives leave them due to their lifestyles. While he succeeds in getting Vinnie to a suburb in California and a private home, Barney has one more problem: he must make sure the jovial and sometimes mischievous Vinnie conforms to Witness Protection protocol until he testifies against mob kingpins.

Cast
 Steve Martin as Vinnie Antonelli / Tod Wilkinson
 Rick Moranis as Barney Coopersmith
 Joan Cusack as Hannah Stubbs
 Melanie Mayron as Crystal Rybak
 Bill Irwin as Kirby
 Carol Kane as Shaldeen
 William Hickey as Billy Sparrow / Johnny Bird
 Deborah Rush as Linda Antonelli
 Daniel Stern as Will Stubbs
 Jesse Bradford as Jamie Stubbs
 Corey Carrier as Tommie Stubbs
 Seth Jaffe as Umberto Mello
 Robert Miranda as Lilo Mello
 Ed Lauter as Robert Underwood
 Julie Bovasso as Vinnie's mother
 Colleen Camp as Dr. Margaret Snow Coopersmith
 Gordon Currie as Wally Bunting
 Raymond O'Connor as Dino
 Troy Evans as Nicky
 Carol Ann Susi as Filomena

Production

Casting
Ephron first pitched the idea for the film to Goldie Hawn and Anthea Sylbert (who went on to produce the film) in 1987. After Hawn left the project in 1989, Steve Martin was cast to play Coopersmith, with Arnold Schwarzenegger playing the role of Antonelli. However, Schwarzenegger was offered the role of Det. John Kimble in Kindergarten Cop and left the production. Failing to find another suitable "Vinnie" for Martin's Coopersmith (Danny DeVito turned down the role), Martin offered to take on the part of Vinnie himself. Producers agreed, and then cast Rick Moranis as Coopersmith, who had originally been considered for the role, but was unavailable.

Filming
Principal photography began in October 1989. It took place primarily in the California cities of San Luis Obispo, Atascadero, Paso Robles, and the surrounding area, though the nominal setting is a fictional suburb of San Diego. Some scenes were shot in San Diego. The film's title comes from the famous song performed by Fats Domino, which appears on the soundtrack.

Music
The film's score was composed by Ira Newborn.
 "My Blue Heaven" (Music: Walter Donaldson, Lyrics: George A. Whiting) – Fats Domino
 "Surfin' U.S.A." (Chuck Berry and Brian Wilson) – The Beach Boys
 "Stranger in Paradise" (Robert Wright and George Forrest) – Tony Bennett
 "I Can't Help Myself (Sugar Pie Honey Bunch)" (Brian Holland, Lamont Dozier, and Eddie Holland) – Billy Hill
 "The Boy from New York City" (John Taylor and George Davis) – The Ad Libs
 "New York, New York" (John Kander and Fred Ebb)
 "Take Me Out to the Ball Game" (Albert von Tilzer and Jerry Northworth)
 "The Star-Spangled Banner" – United States Marine Band

Reception

Box office
My Blue Heaven opened in 1,859 venues on August 17, 1990 and earned $6.2 million in its debut, ranking fourth in the North American box office and second among the week's new releases. It closed with a domestic gross of $23.6 million.

Critical response
 Metacritic reports a weighted average score of 35 out of 100, based on 14 critics, indicating "generally unfavorable reviews". Audiences polled by CinemaScore gave the film an average grade of "B−" on an A+ to F scale.

David J. Fox of The New York Times said the film was "a truly funny concept and a disappointment on the screen."

See also

 List of media set in San Diego

References

External links
 
 
 
 

1990 films
1990s English-language films
1990s black comedy films
American black comedy films
Films about the American Mafia
Films scored by Ira Newborn
Films directed by Herbert Ross
Films set in San Diego
Films shot in San Diego
Mafia comedy films
Films with screenplays by Nora Ephron
Films about witness protection
Warner Bros. films
1990 comedy films
1990s American films